The Embassy of the Republic of Korea in the Republic of Peru is the higher diplomatic representation of the Republic of Korea in Peru.

The current South Korean ambassador is Yung-Joon Jo.

History
Peru and South Korea established relations on April 1, 1963. The Korean ambassador to Brazil was initially accredited to Peru, until an embassy in Lima was opened on August 1, 1971.

During the internal conflict in Peru, the embassy was targeted on two occasions: once on September 11, 1987 (alongside police stations and power grids) and a second time on November 23, 1988, abeit unsuccessfully.

See also
Embassy of North Korea, Lima
List of ambassadors of Peru to South Korea

References

Peru
Korea, South
Peru–South Korea relations